Four vessels of the Royal Navy have borne the name HMS Bold.

She ran aground near Yarmouth, Isle of Wight in a gale on 6 January 1811 and was broken up in April.
 , a 12-gun  built at Bursledon in 1812. On the morning of 27 September 1813 a strong current drove her on shore near the north end of Prince Edward Island and she was wrecked, but the crew was saved.
 HMS Bold, the ex-, which had just been recaptured from the Danes. A new  having just been commissioned, and a HMS Bold just having been lost, the Admiralty recycled the name. She was sold on 11 August 1814.
 , a tugboat built for the U.S. Navy as Bold (BAT-8) along the lines of American ATRs; was transferred to the United Kingdom on 29 June 1942; returned to the U.S. Navy in January 1946 at Subic Bay; sold 1948.

Sources
 
 

Royal Navy ship names